In baseball, batting average (AVG) is a measure of a batter's success rate in achieving a hit during an at bat, and is calculated by dividing a player's hits by his at bats.  The achievement of a .400 batting average in a season is recognized as "the standard of hitting excellence", in light of how batting .300 in a season is already regarded as solid.  Forty-two players have recorded a batting average of at least .400 in a single Major League Baseball (MLB) season as of 2021, the last being Willard Brown of the Kansas City Monarchs and Artie Wilson of the Birmingham Black Barons in 1948.  Five players – Ed Delahanty, Ty Cobb, Rogers Hornsby, Oscar Charleston, and  Josh Gibson– have accomplished the feat in three different seasons, the highest batting average for a single season was .4711 single-season record established by Tetelo Vargas in 1943.  Ross Barnes was the first player to bat .400 in a season, posting a .429 batting average in the National League's inaugural 1876 season.

In total, 42 players have reached the .400 mark in MLB history and nine have done so more than once.  Of these, twenty one were right-handed batters, nineteen were left-handed, and two were switch hitter, meaning they could bat from either side of the plate.  Three of these players (Terry, Leonard and Williams) played for only one major league team.  The Philadelphia Phillies are the only franchise to have four players reach the milestone while on their roster: Delahanty, Billy Hamilton, Sam Thompson, and Tuck Turner, all of whom attained a batting average over .400 during the 1894 season.  Three players won the Most Valuable Player (MVP) Award in the same year as their .400 season.  Tip O'Neill, Nap Lajoie, Josh Gibson, Willie Wells, Mule Suttles, Oscar Charleston (3 times), Heavy Johnson and Rogers Hornsby (twice) also earned the Triple Crown alongside achieving a .400 batting average, leading their respective leagues in batting average, home runs and runs batted in (RBI).  Although Ray Dandridge's .432 batting average in 1934 did not earn him the Negro National League's batting title, it established a major league record for a rookie that stands to this day.  Fred Dunlap has the lowest career batting average among players who have batted .400 in a season with .292, while Cobb – with .366 – recorded the highest career average in major league history.

Given the decades that have elapsed since Brown and Wilson became the last players to achieve the feat and the integral changes to the way the game of baseball is played since then – such as the increased utilization of specialized relief pitchers – a writer for The Washington Post called the mark "both mystical and unattainable".  Consequently, modern day attempts to reach the hallowed mark by Rod Carew (.388 in 1977), George Brett (.390 in 1980) and Tony Gwynn (.394 in the strike-shortened 1994 season) have generated considerable hype among fans and in the media.  Of the thirty-four players eligible for the Baseball Hall of Fame who have batted .400 in a season, twenty-four have been elected and two were elected on the first ballot.  Players are eligible for the Hall of Fame if they have played in at least 10 MLB seasons, and have either been retired for five seasons or deceased for at least six months. These requirements leave seven players ineligible who did not play in at least 10 seasons.  Shoeless Joe Jackson is ineligible for the Hall of Fame because he was permanently banned from baseball in 1921 for his involvement in the Black Sox Scandal.

Players

See also

List of Major League Baseball batting champions
List of Major League Baseball career batting average leaders

Notes

References
General

Specific

Batting, 400
Major League Baseball statistics